Michael Noonan (September 12, 1947 – February 23, 2009), was an American linguist specializing in functional and typological linguistics. He graduated from UCLA with a PhD in Linguistics in 1981. He specialized in particular in Tibeto-Burman, Nilotic (Lango language), the Chantyal language, and the Nar Phu language.

References

1947 births
2009 deaths
People from Auburn, New York
Linguists from the United States
20th-century linguists